Ernest Isadore Hatfield (April 23, 1890 – March 1977) was an American politician from New York.

Life
He was born on April 23, 1890, in Valhalla, Westchester County, New York, the son of Gilbert Joshua Hatfield (1836-1922) and Adele Marie Antoinette (Ledelley) Hatfield (1849-1924). He attended the public schools, and Eastman-Gaines Business College in New York City. He engaged in the real estate and insurance business, and later also in banking, in Poughkeepsie. He owned a 400-acre farm in Hyde Park, Dutchess County, New York.

Hatfield was a member of the New York State Assembly from 1943 to 1947, sitting in the 164th, 165th and 166th New York State Legislatures. He resigned his seat to run for the State Senate seat vacated by the resignation of Frederic H. Bontecou.

Hatfield was elected on November 4, 1947, to the New York State Senate (33rd D.), and took his seat in the 166th New York State Legislature at the beginning of the session in January 1948. He was re-elected several times and remained in the State Senate until 1964, sitting in the 167th, 168th, 169th, 170th, 171st, 172nd, 173rd and 174th New York State Legislatures.

He died in March 1977 in Dutchess County, New York.

Sources

External links
 The Ernest I. Hatfield papers at the M. E. Grenander Department of Special Collections and Archives, University at Albany, SUNY

1890 births
1977 deaths
People from Valhalla, New York
Republican Party New York (state) state senators
Politicians from Poughkeepsie, New York
Republican Party members of the New York State Assembly
20th-century American politicians